
Gmina Kuźnia Raciborska is an urban-rural gmina (administrative district) in Racibórz County, Silesian Voivodeship, in southern Poland.

Villages
Apart from the town of Kuźnia Raciborska, Gmina Kuźnia Raciborska contains the villages and settlements of Budziska, Jankowice, Ruda, Ruda Kozielska, Rudy, Siedliska and Turze.

Neighbouring gminas
Gmina Kuźnia Raciborska is bordered by the city of Rybnik and by the gminas of Bierawa, Cisek, Lyski, Nędza, Pilchowice, Rudnik and Sośnicowice.

Twin towns – sister cities

Gmina Kuźnia Raciborska is twinned with:
 Kelheim, Germany
 Odry, Czech Republic

Gallery

References

Kuznia Raciborska
Racibórz County